Barry Sandler (born February 23, 1947 in Buffalo, New York) is an American screenwriter and film producer. His career has spanned several decades, with the 1980s being his most prolific. The openly gay Sandler is perhaps best known for writing the 1982 film Making Love, the first mainstream Hollywood film to deal seriously with issues of homosexuality and coming out. Sandler discussed Making Love in the 1995 documentary film The Celluloid Closet.

In addition to his successful writing career, Sandler also teaches screenwriting at the University of Central Florida and serves as one Artistic Director to Outfest, a gay and lesbian film festival in Los Angeles.

He is the recipient of the GLAAD Media Award and the Outfest 2002 Gay Pioneer Award for Courage and Artistry, and was named by The Advocate as one of the most influential gay artists in America.

Filmography

Writer
 Kansas City Bomber – 1972
 The Loners – 1972
 The Duchess and the Dirtwater Fox – 1976
 Gable and Lombard – 1976
 The Other Side of Midnight – 1977 (uncredited)
 The Mirror Crack'd – 1980
 Evil Under the Sun – 1982 (uncredited)
 Making Love – 1982
 Crimes of Passion – 1984
 All-American Murder – 1992
  – 2003

 Knock ‘em Dead – 2014

Producer
 Making Love – 1982 (associate producer)
 Crimes of Passion – 1984
 All-American Murder – 1992 (co-producer)

References

External links
 

1947 births
Film producers from New York (state)
American male screenwriters
American gay writers
American LGBT screenwriters
LGBT people from New York (state)
Living people
Writers from Buffalo, New York
University of Central Florida faculty
Screenwriters from New York (state)
Screenwriters from Florida
21st-century LGBT people